Plug RTL is a general Luxembourgish French speaking commercial television chain with international presence and targeting adolescents and young people (15-34 age bracket). The station is particularly popular in francophone parts of Belgium (Wallonia and Brussels), but also somewhat in Flanders, the Dutch-speaking region of Belgium as well.

It rebroadcasts programming mainly from popular French stations, particularly from M6, reality TV shows and musical competitions like Nouvelle Star, La France a un incroyable talent, Rising Star, music videos and some internally produced programming like Lifestyle with Agathe Lecaron, Le Mag People and a weekly music programme. Other notable local programming includes Un dîner presque parfait, Criss Angel le magicien gothique etc.

The channel used the slogan "Complètement Plug" in 2005, "Plug RTL, une rentrée Lifestyle" in 2007, "Exprimes ton coté Plug!" in 2010 and presently "La chaîne Lifestyle".

History and ownership
The station was launched as Plug TV on 13 February 2004 and rename Plug RTL on 7 September 2007. 30 August 2010 marked moving to HD broadcasting as Plug RTL HD.

Plug RTL is run by Société luxembourgeoise RTL Belux S.A. & cie SECS, and is held by:
65.6% -- CLT-UFA S.A, affiliate at 99.7% of RTL Group
33.8% -- Belgian company Audiopresse S.A. 
0.6% -- RTL Belux S.A.

 is CEO and Eusebio Larrea, head of production.

RTL Belux S.A. & cie SECS has agreements with RTL Belgium S.A. to produce programmes for Plug RTL and two other stations, RTL-TVI (generalist station) and Club RTL specialising in films, sports, children programming. RTL Belgium S.A. is held by CLT-UFA S.A. (66%) and Audiopresse S.A. (34%).

The head offices of Plug RTL are situated in KB2 building built by CLT-UFA in at 45, boulevard Pierre-Frieden, Kirchberg, Luxembourg, that allows the chain a Luxembourg location allowing it to continue as a licensed Luxembourg company to broadcast within Luxembourg. RTL Belgium on the other hand is located at RTL House, on avenue Jacques Georgin, Schaerbeek (Brussels), Belgium.

RTL Belgium was acquired by DPG Media and Groupe Rossel on 31 March 2022, ended almost 31 years ownership by RTL Group.

References

External links
Official page on RTL.be

Mass media in Luxembourg
Television channels in Belgium
Television in Luxembourg
Television channels and stations established in 2004
RTL Group
Bertelsmann subsidiaries
French-language television stations in Belgium